The Northern Ireland football league system is categorised into three levels: senior, intermediate and junior. Clubs attain intermediate status by fulfilling certain criteria (e.g. owning or leasing its own enclosed ground). Senior status requires clubs to reach stricter criteria. National leagues exist at senior and intermediate level. All junior leagues and some intermediate are organised on a regional basis.

Regionally, there are four regional football associations: the North East Ulster Football Association (also known as the County Antrim & District Football Association), the Mid-Ulster Football Association, the North West of Ireland Football Association and the Fermanagh & Western Football Association.

Senior

The Northern Ireland Football League, which is the national league of Northern Ireland, has two senior divisions, the NIFL Irish Premiership and the NIFL Championship, which consists of twenty-four semi-professional clubs. Members of the Premiership must possess a domestic licence in order to retain membership and members of the Championship must possess a championship licence. Clubs that wish to be promoted to the Championship from intermediate football must attain a Championship Licence.

At national level there are two senior cup competitions: the Irish Cup and the Northern Ireland Football League Cup, although intermediate teams are entitled to enter both.

At regional level, three of the four regional FAs organise their own senior cup competition. The North East Ulster Football Association runs the County Antrim Shield; the Mid-Ulster Football Association organises the Mid-Ulster Cup and the North West of Ireland Football Association organises the North West Senior Cup.

Intermediate

The national league has one intermediate division: the NIFL Premier Intermediate League. Two clubs are automatically promoted from the Premier Intermediate League to the Championship at the end of each season, and two clubs are relegated to the Premier Intermediate League from the Championship. In the event, however, that either of the Premier Intermediate League teams does not possess a Championship Licence, they are not promoted.

The NIFL Premiership Development League, which is also an intermediate league, comprises the reserve teams of the twelve senior NIFL Premiership clubs.

In 2010-11, a "pyramid" system was introduced, with the possibility of promotion and relegation between the national league and the four regional intermediate leagues, namely:

Ballymena & Provincial League
Mid-Ulster Football League
Northern Amateur League
Northern Ireland Intermediate League

Clubs in these leagues may only gain promotion to the Premier Intermediate League if they win their respective league championship and meet the necessary criteria. If more than one league champion meets the criteria, then only one will be promoted, to be decided by a play-off or series of play-offs.

At national level there is one intermediate cup competition: the Intermediate Cup. At regional level, three of the four regional FAs organise their own cup competitions. The North East Ulster Football Association runs the Steel & Sons Cup; the Mid-Ulster Football Association organises the Bob Radcliffe Cup; and the North West of Ireland Football Association organises the Craig Memorial Cup. The Fermanagh & Western Football Association organised the Fermanagh & Western Intermediate Cup for three seasons, but it is now defunct.

Junior

There are numerous junior leagues in Northern Ireland, including junior divisions of the Northern Amateur League and the Mid-Ulster League. The term "junior" is not related to the age of the players but the fact that the clubs are at amateur level.

There is one national junior cup competition: the Irish Junior Cup. At regional level, each of the four regional FAs organises its own cup competition. The North East Ulster Football Association runs the County Antrim Junior Shield; the Mid-Ulster Football Association organises the Mid-Ulster Shield, the North West of Ireland Football Association organises the North-West Junior Cup, and the Fermanagh & Western Football Association organises the Mulhern Cup.

The current pyramid system
For each division, its official name and number of clubs is given:

Previous systems
At national level, from 1890 until 1915 there was only one league the Irish Football League, which operated at senior level.

In 1915, the Irish Intermediate League was created at intermediate level.

In 1951, the B Division was also created at intermediate level. By 1954, the Irish Intermediate League had become defunct as many clubs left to join the B Division.

In 1977, the B Division split into Section 1 and Section 2.

In 1995, the Irish Football League split into two senior divisions: the Premier Division and the First Division.

In 1999, the B Division Section 1 was renamed the Second Division and Section 2 was renamed the Reserve League.

In 2003, the Irish Premier League was created as the single senior league in Northern Ireland. The Irish Football League First Division reverted to intermediate status alongside the Second Division.

In 2004, the IFA Intermediate League (First and Second Divisions) replaced the Irish Football League.

In 2008, the IFA Premiership replaced the Irish Premier League, and the IFA Championship and IFA Interim Intermediate League replaced the IFA Intermediate League.

In 2009, the IFA Championship was expanded and divided into two divisions and the IFA Interim Intermediate League folded.

In 2010, a pyramid system was introduced, with the possibility of promotion and relegation between the Championship and the four regional intermediate leagues.

In 2013, the Northern Ireland Football League (NIFL) took control of the senior league and the two intermediate divisions below, as well as the Reserve League.

In 2016, Championship 1 acquired senior status and was renamed the 'Championship'; Championship 2 was renamed the 'Premier Intermediate League'; the Reserve League became the Development League.

National league system since 1890

† Senior clubs' reserve teams have intermediate status and compete against other intermediate teams in many competitions.

Women's system
The women's system currently has six steps. Each step has only one division. There is promotion and relegation between all levels. They are:
1: Women's Premier League
2: Women's Championship
3: Women's Divisions North 1-2 and South 1-2

References

Football league systems in Europe